Camilo da Silva Sanvezzo (born 21 July 1988) is a Brazilian professional footballer who plays as a forward for Liga MX club Toluca. He is a Mexican naturalized citizen.

Club career

Corinthians Alagoano
Camilo began his career in the youth ranks of Oeste Paulista Esporte Clube. In 2009, he moved to Corinthians Alagoano and remained there one year before taking his career to Europe.

Qormi FC
Camilo had a successful start with Qormi, scoring the winning goal on his debut against Sliema Wanderers, a hat-trick against Msida St. Joseph, and another hat-trick against reigning champions Hibernians.

Come midseason Qormi received an offer from a South Korean club for the striker, although they rejected the offer, explaining the bid was too small and Camilo's important role at the club.

Camilo played a vital role in Qormi's successful season, scoring 24 goals in 22 league matches – an average of more than one goal per game.

Gyeongnam FC
On 7 July 2010, Camilo moved to K-League side Gyeongnam. Camilo struggled to capture the form that made him a prolific scorer in Malta. With Gyeongnam he appeared in seven games without scoring a goal. However, he did score six goals in seven appearances for the club's 'B' team.

Vancouver Whitecaps FC
Camilo trialed with Vancouver Whitecaps FC of Major League Soccer prior to the 2011 season. His trial was successful and the club signed him on 17 March 2011. He made his debut for the Whitecaps as a late substitute in their opening game of the 2011 season against Toronto FC. He scored his first two goals for the Whitecaps on 2 April 2011 against Sporting Kansas City, contributing the team's second and third goals in a 3–3 comeback draw; this also made him the first player in MLS history to score two goals in stoppage time. Camilo was named as the Whitecaps FC Player of the Year for his contributions to the team during the 2011 season, including a team-high 12 goals and consistency on the field.

Camilo signed a contract extension with Vancouver on 1 February 2012. However, Camilo did not have a great start to the year. He did not regain his consistent form until the final games of the season. Camilo scored a goal and added 3 assists in a 4-0 win against Chivas USA. In total, Camilo tallied five goals and 7 assists in 28 matches during the 2012 Major League Soccer season, compared to 12 goals and 3 assists the prior season.

Camilo rebounded from a mediocre 2012 season to be considered a potential league MVP candidate in 2013. During the season, Camilo tallied 6 assists.  Additionally, Camilo closed the 2013 season with a hat-trick at home against Colorado Rapids to win the MLS scoring race with 22 goals.

Following his impressive season, Camilo was the subject of interest from Rosenborg, Norway's most decorated club. However, at that time, Whitecaps president Bob Lenarduzzi indicated that Camilo was under contract and that the club was looking forward to having him back for the 2014 season. In January 2014, Camilo was once again the subject of transfer rumors after reportedly being linked to Querétaro of Mexico's Liga MX, with some media outlets even reporting that the deal was already completed. However, Whitecaps management quickly stated that there was no truth to the rumors, and details were subsequently removed from Querétaro' website. However, despite the denial a deal had been reached, Camilo continued to train with Querétaro. Whitecaps officials labelled Camilo's behaviour as "unacceptable and inappropriate" and "unprofessional".  Fan reaction was split, with anger directed both at Camilo and the Whitecaps front office for how the situation was handled.

Querétaro
On 17 January 2014, the transfer saga came to an end as Vancouver received a then club record $2.1 million transfer fee. 
In the Apertura 2014, Camilo was the top goal scorer of the tournament with 12 goals (tied with Mauro Boselli).
Just weeks after his return from a knee injury that kept him out of the Clausura 2015, Sanvezzo sustained another injury and missed the rest of the Apertura 2015 and a major part of the 2016 Clausura. On 15 April 2016, after more than seven months injured, Camilo returned in a home match where Querétaro defeated Club América 1–0.Camilo's nickname became "El Lobo" in 2016. 
On 28 April 2019, Camilo scored his final goal as well as providing an assist to then teammate Ayron del Valle in 2–1 home win against Veracruz. The following week on 4 May 2019, he played his final game against Necaxa playing the full 90 minutes, the match ended in a 1–0 loss.

As of 28 April 2019, he is the club's all time top scorer with 67 goals.

International career
Camilo has not represented Brazil, his country of birth, at any level. In July 2013, it was revealed that Camilo was considering representing Canada internationally. Camilo applied for permanent residency but had to wait to gain full citizenship before he could appear for the Canadian national team, a process that Ghana-born former Whitecaps teammate Gershon Koffie was already undertaking. About the prospect, Camilo stated, "Vancouver is a good city, Canada is a beautiful country and if I get the opportunity I will decide with my family."

Career statistics

Honours
Querétaro
 Copa MX: Apertura 2016
 Supercopa MX: 2017

Individual
 Maltese Premier League top goalscorer: 2009–10
Vancouver Whitecaps FC Player of the Year: 2011, 2013
 Canadian Championship Golden Boot: 2013
 MLS All-Star: 2013
 MLS Golden Boot: 2013
 MLS Goal of the Year Award: 2013
 Liga MX top scorer: Apertura 2014 (shared with Mauro Boselli)

References

External links

 
 
 

1988 births
Living people
Association football forwards
Brazilian expatriate footballers
Brazilian expatriate sportspeople in Canada
Brazilian expatriate sportspeople in Mexico
Brazilian expatriate sportspeople in Malta
Brazilian expatriate sportspeople in South Korea
Brazilian footballers
Expatriate footballers in Malta
Expatriate footballers in Mexico
Expatriate footballers in South Korea
Expatriate soccer players in Canada
Gyeongnam FC players
K League 1 players
Liga MX players
Major League Soccer All-Stars
Major League Soccer players
People from Presidente Prudente, São Paulo
Qormi F.C. players
Querétaro F.C. footballers
Vancouver Whitecaps FC players
Club Tijuana footballers
Mazatlán F.C. footballers
Footballers from São Paulo (state)